Now Deh-e Lakvan (also Romanized as Now Deh-e Lakvān, Nowdeh-e Lakvān, Nowdeh Lakvān, and Now Deh-ye Lakvān; also known as Nūdah and Nudakh) is a village in Dashtabi-ye Sharqi Rural District, Dashtabi District, Buin Zahra County, Qazvin Province, Iran. At the 2006 census, its population was 478, in 121 families.

References 

Populated places in Buin Zahra County